"Just a Little More Love" is the debut single released by French DJ David Guetta, featuring vocals from  American singer Chris Willis. It appears on his debut album, of the same name, and was released as the lead single from that album. The song was recorded in only thirty minutes. There are two versions of the song on the Just a Little More Love album, the original edit, subtitled the elektro edit, and the remix version, the Wally López remix, which is also featured on MoS: Clubbers Guide 2004 and the soundtrack to The Football Factory. The music video for the track was directed by Jean-Charles Carré, and features an appearance by David Guetta, although Chris Willis does not feature.

Track listing
 UK CD single (2003)
 "Just a Little More Love" (Wally López remix edit)
 "Just a Little More Love" (elektro edit)

 French CD single (2001)
 "Just a Little More Love" (elektro edit)
 "Just a Little More Love" (elektro maxi)
 "Just a Little More Love" (remix edit)
 "Just a Little More Love" (remix maxi)

 German CD single (2002)
 "Just a Little More Love" (elektro edit)
 "Just a Little More Love" (vocal house edit)

 German maxi single (2002)
 "Just a Little More Love" (Wally López remix edit)
 "Just a Little More Love" (elektro edit)
 "Just a Little More Love" (Problem Kid Fat Bottom funk remix)

 Spanish CD single (2003)
 "Just a Little More Love" (Wally López remix edit)
 "Just a Little More Love" (elektro edit)
 "Just a Little More Love" (Wally López remix)

Charts

References

External links
ShieldSquare Captcha

2001 debut singles
David Guetta songs
Songs written by David Guetta
Songs written by Chris Willis
Songs written by Joachim Garraud
Chris Willis songs
2001 songs
Virgin Records singles
Song recordings produced by David Guetta